This is a listing of the history of the World Record for the 50 backstroke swimming event. Swimming World Records are maintained by FINA, the international sports federation which oversees the sport. World Records are recognized only in meter-courses: long course (50m) and short course (25m). Like the other 50s of stroke (i.e. 50 breaststroke, 50 butterfly), World Record status/monitoring for this event first began in the 1990s.

Men

Long course

Short course

Women

Long course

Short course

All-time top 25

Men long course
Correct as of March 2023

Notes
Below is a list of other times equal or superior to 24.47:
Kliment Kolesnikov also swam 23.93 (2021), 24.00 (2018), 24.08 (2021), 24.23 (2021), 24.25 (2018, 2021), 24.35 (2019), 24.40 (2018), 24.46 (2018).
Hunter Armstrong also swam 24.01 (2022), 24.14 (2022), 24.16 (2022).
Justin Ress also swam 24.05 (2022), 24.12 (2022), 24.14 (2022), 24.24 (2022), 24.31 (2018), 24.41 (2017), 24.46 (2018), 24.47 (2018).
Liam Tancock also swam 24.08 (2009), 24.47 (2008).
Camille Lacourt also swam 24.23 (2015), 24.27 (2015), 24.30 (2017), 24.30 (2010), 24.35 (2017), 24.36 (2011), 24.37 (2014), 24.39 (2013), 24.42 (2013), 24.46 (2009).
Junya Koga also swam 24.28 (2014), 24.29 (2009), 24.36 (2015), 24.44 (2017), 24.46 (2014).
Vladimir Morozov also swam 24.35 (2018), 24.40 (2019), 24.43 (2018, 2019).
Apostolos Christou also swam 24.39 (2022).
Robert Glință also swam 24.42 (2021).
Isaac Cooper also swam 24.44 (2022).
Michael Andrew also swam 24.45 (2019).
Shaine Casas also swam 24.45 (2022).
Zane Waddell also swam 24.46 (2019).
Thomas Ceccon also swam 24.46 (2022).
Xu Jiayu also swam 24.47 (2019).

Men short course
Correct as of December 2022

Notes
Below is a list of other times equal or superior to 22.85:
Kliment Kolesnikov also swam 22.31 (2022), 22.47 (2021), 22.57 (2021), 22.64 (2019), 22.75 (2019), 22.76 (2021), 22.77 (2018), 22.82 (2018), 22.83 (2017).
Ryan Murphy also swam 22.54 (2020), 22.56 (2021), 22.61 (2022), 22.63 (2018, 2021), 22.64 (2022), 22.73 (2018), 22.74 (2022), 22.75 (2020), 22.76 (2020), 22.79 (2021), 22.80 (2020), 22.83 (2020), 22.85 (2020).
Evgeny Rylov also swam 22.59 (2021), 22.68 (2018), 22.76 (2020), 22.80 (2020).
Guilherme Guido also swam 22.60 (2021, 2021), 22.68 (2018), 22.73 (2021), 22.75 (2018), 22.77 (2019), 22.79 (2018), 22.82 (2019).
Michele Lamberti also swam 22.65 (2021), 22.79 (2021).
Mark Nikolaev also swam 22.70 (2021).
Jiayu Xu also swam 22.71 (2018).
Peter Marshall also swam 22.73 (2009), 22.75 (2009).
Isaac Cooper also swam 22.66 (2022), 22.73 (2022), 22.79 (2022).
Stanislav Donets also swam 22.76 (2009), 22.79 (2009), 22.80 (2009).
Coleman Stewart also swam 22.76 (2020), 22.84 (2020).
Kacper Stokowski also swam 22.78 (2022).
Lorenzo Mora also swam 22.81 (2022).
Shane Ryan also swam 22.82 (2021).
Pavel Sankovich also swam 22.84 (2017).
Christian Diener also swam 22.84 (2021).

Women long course
Correct as of March 2023

Notes
Below is a list of other times equal or superior to 27.49:
Fu Yuanhui also swam 27.15 (2017), 27.16 (2018), 27.18 (2015), 27.19 (2017), 27.21 (2017), 27.22 (2013), 27.36 (2017), 27.39 (2013), 27.40 (2013).
Kira Toussaint also swam 27.18 (2021), 27.22 (2021), 27.36 (2021), 27.37 (2020), 27.49 (2019, 2020).
Etiene Medeiros also swam 27.18 (2017), 27.26 (2015), 27.36 (2019), 27.37 (2014), 27.38 (2015), 27.41 (2015), 27.44 (2019).
Kylie Masse also swam 27.22 (2022), 27.26 (2022), 27.31 (2022, 2022), 27.38 (2023), 27.47 (2022, 2022, 2022).
Georgia Davies also swam 27.23 (2018), 27.46 (2018), 27.49 (2017).
Regan Smith also swam 27.29 (2022), 27.40 (2022), 27.47 (2022).
Kathleen Dawson also swam 27.29 (2021), 27.46 (2021).
Analia Pigrée also swam 27.29 (2022), 27.40 (2022).
Zhao Jing also swam 27.29 (2013).
Anastasia Fesikova also swam 27.31 (2009, 2018), 27.37 (2018), 27.38 (2009), 27.49 (2018).
Kaylee McKeown also swam 27.31 (2023), 27.38 (2021), 27.41 (2021), 27.45 (2021), 27.46 (2021), 27.47 (2022).
Liu Xiang also swam 27.35 (2019), 27.36 (2020), 27.40 (2018).
Gao Chang also swam 27.38 (2009), 27.45 (2010).
Katharine Berkoff also swam 27.39 (2022), 27.40 (2022), 27.44 (2022), 27.49 (2022).
Daniela Samulski also swam 27.39 (2009).
Aliaksandra Herasimenia also swam 27.40 (2016).
Olivia Smoliga also swam 27.43 (2018).
Ingrid Wilm also swam 27.43 (2022).
Mollie O'Callaghan also swam 27.46 (2022), 27.47 (2022).
Emily Seebohm also swam 27.47 (2015), 27.49 (2015).

Women short course
Correct as of December 2022

Notes
Below is a list of other times equal or superior to 26.00:
Maggie MacNeil also swam 25.27 (2022), 25.64 (2022), 25.84 (2021), 25.92 (2021), 25.98 (2021).
Kira Toussaint also swam 25.62 (2020), 25.64 (2020), 25.73 (2020), 25.75 (2019, 2020), 25.79 (2020, 2021), 25.81 (2021), 25.83 (2020), 25.84 (2019), 25.89 (2021), 25.91 (2021), 25.96 (2020), 25.99 (2021).
Claire Curzan also swam 25.60 (2022), 25.75 (2022).
Mollie O'Callaghan also swam 25.61 (2022), 25.69 (2022), 25.99 (2022).
Olivia Smoliga also swam 25.75 (2020), 25.83 (2020),  25.85 (2020), 25.88 (2018), 25.89 (2019, 2020), 25.93 (2020), 25.97 (2018).
Kylie Masse also swam 25.81 (2022), 25.84 (2021, 2022), 25.92 (2021), 25.94 (2022), 25.96 (2021), 25.97 (2021, 2022).
Etiene Medeiros also swam 25.82 (2016), 25.95 (2018), 25.99 (2014), 26.00 (2016).
Louise Hansson also swam 25.86 (2021, 2022), 25.91 (2021), 25.99 (2022), 26.00 (2022).
Emily Seebohm also swam 25.87 (2014).
Zhao Jing also swam 25.95 (2012).
Minna Atherton also swam 25.95 (2021), 25.99 (2019).
Katinka Hosszú also swam 25.96 (2014), 25.99 (2016).
Maaike de Waard also swam 25.99 (2021).
Gao Chang also swam 26.00 (2010).

References
  Zwemkroniek
  Agenda Diana

Backstroke 050 metres
World record progression 050 metres backstroke